"Your Love" is a song by American rapper and producer Diddy and his group Dirty Money, released as the fifth single from their debut album Last Train to Paris (2010). It features R&B singer Trey Songz and production from Polow da Don. The music video version features an additional intro verse by rapper Rick Ross, whom also wrote Diddy's verse on the song.

Credits and personnel 
The credits for "Your Love" are adapted from the liner notes of Last Train to Paris.

Recording
 Recorded at: Daddy’s House Recording Studio in New York City.
 Diddy – vocals
 Dawn Richard – vocals
 Kalenna Harper – vocals
 Polow da Don – songwriting, production
 Indira Boodram – songwriting
 Kesia Hollins – songwriting
 Jazmyn Michel – songwriting
 Alja Jackson – songwriting
 Rick Ross – songwriting
 V. Bozeman – vocal production
 Matthew Tiesta – audio engineering
 Steve Dickey – audio engineering
 Jeremy Stevenson – audio engineering, mixing
 Miles Walker – mixing
 Brian Allison – mixing assistance
 Nolan Wescott – mixing assistance

Charts

Weekly charts

Year-end charts

Radio and release history

References 

2010 songs
2011 singles
Sean Combs songs
Trey Songz songs
Bad Boy Records singles
Music videos directed by Colin Tilley
Song recordings produced by Polow da Don
Songs written by Polow da Don
Songs written by Rick Ross
Songs written by Trey Songz